The Borusan Istanbul Philharmonic Orchestra, also known as the BIPO, is a Turkish orchestra based in Istanbul that was formed by enlarging the Borusan Chamber Orchestra in 1999. It is funded by the Borusan Holding.

History
The Borusan Istanbul Philharmonic Orchestra was founded as the Borusan Chamber Orchestra in 1993. This initiative by Borusan, a leading Turkish industrial conglomerate, entering into the complex and challenging world of establishing orchestras, was based on its vision of helping to bring polyphonic music to a wider audience of Turkish people.  This group rapidly grew in both number of musicians and quality of musical performance, so that it became a symphonic orchestra in 1999. That same year, Maestro Gürer Aykal was appointed as the general music director and permanent conductor of the orchestra.

On 13 May 1999, at the Yıldız Palace Silahhane Building on the European side of Istanbul, the Borusan Istanbul Philharmonic Orchestra performed its first concert and soon began offering concerts on the Anatolian side of the city as well. By the end of 1999, BIFO was performing two concerts per month, one on each side of the Bosphorus, at the Istanbul Lütfi Kırdar Convention and Exhibition Center on the European side and at the Kadiköy People's Education Center on the Asian side, thereby quickly becoming a true city orchestra. This pattern continues until this day, totaling twenty-four concerts per year, with performances on the Anatolian side now being held at the Caddebostan Cultural Center. For the international audience of the Istanbul Festival, the BIFO has become a well known and esteemed musical standard for many years.

BIPO continues to serve as a bridge between the people of Turkey and the European tradition in classical music.

Musical programs and performances 
Over the years, the Borusan Istanbul Philharmonic Orchestra has introduced classical music lovers in Istanbul to some of the world's foremost musicians.  The orchestra has had the privilege of performing with virtuosos such as Maxim Vengerov, Vadim Gluzman, Dimitris Sgouros, Alexander Rudin, Suna Kan, İdil Biret, Fazıl Say, Ayşegül Sarıca, Meral Güneyman, Ayla Erduran, Verda Erman, Gülsin Onay, Anna Tomowa-Sintow, Olga Kern, Corey Cerovsek and Stanislav Ioudenitch. Celebrated guest conductors, who have led the orchestra include Igor Oistrak, Emil Tabakov, Giuseppe Lanzetta, Fabiano Monica, Alain Paris, and Ender Sakpınar. In addition, BIFO has also been accompanied by the Wiener Singverein, one of the world's leading choirs.

One of the most popular traditions in its short history is Borusan Istanbul Philharmonic Orchestra's annual "New Year Celebration" concerts. Held in December of every year, these highly anticipated performances are known for bringing cheer and goodwill to Istanbul during the festive season, not to mention positive cultural attention, through the participation of highly regarded local and world-renowned musicians.

The Borusan Istanbul Philharmonic Orchestra opened the 2007–2008 season in October with a concert conducted by Gürer Aykal, featuring the young Canadian violinist James Ehnes as soloist. Works by Ahmet Adnan Saygun, to commemorate the one hundredth anniversary of his birth, and by Sibelius, to honour the fiftieth anniversary of his death, were performed in this concert. The concert in November was conducted by Josep Caballé-Domenech and the guest soloist was pianist Emre Şen. In the New Year Welcoming Concert in December, the orchestra under the baton of Gürer Aykal accompanied soloist Turgay Hilmi in a work written specifically for Alphorn.

The guests of the Borusan Istanbul Philharmonic Orchestra last season included conductor Andreas Schüller, Ferhan and Ferzan Önder piano duo, Ayhan Uştuk, Çağ Erçağ, Özcan Ulucan, John Lill and conductor Sascha Goetzel. In the gala concert, the orchestra hosted the prominent Philharmonia Chorus and performed Dvořák’s Requiem for the first time in Turkey.

In the opening concerts on November 19 and 20, 2008, the Borusan Istanbul Philharmonic Orchestra was conducted by Gürer Aykal, who recently became the Honorary Conductor of the orchestra.

Proms debut and foreign popularity 
On 29 July 2014, Borusan Istanbul Philharmonic Orchestra made its debut at The Proms at the Royal Albert Hall. In this concert BİFO played Mily Balakirev's Islamey, Gustav Holst's Beni Mora, Gabriel Prokofiev's first violin concerto 1914 (BBC commission: world premiere), Mozart's Die Entführung aus dem Serail (only the ouverture), Handel's "The Arrival of the Queen of Sheba", Ottorino Respighi's Belkis, Queen of Sheba and, as an encore, Ulvi Cemal Erkin's Koçekçe.

After the concert especially at the English press the concert got positive reviews. The Telegraph reporter Ivan Hewett wrote that the concert was "superbly rich". The Guardian'''s Tim Ashley wrote that Sascha Goetzel is more than a conductor, is a total entertainer.

The same day, Borusan Istanbul Philharmonic Orchestra launched their third CD, Rimsky-Korsakov's Scheherazade'' by Onyx Classics in Great Britain.

Artistic director and principal conductor 
After a year-long selection process in the 2007/2008 season with guest conductors from four different countries, an international jury awarded the musical direction of Turkey's foremost symphony orchestra to Austrian conductor Sascha Goetzel.

Goetzel took over from Gürer Aykal, the Borusan Istanbul Philharmonic Orchestra's music director since the founding of the orchestra, and responsible for its artistic development. One of Sascha Goetzel's principal duties is the preparation of concert tours and guest appearances of the orchestra in the framework of major European music festivals in the coming years. The orchestra had a special role to play in the 2010 Istanbul Festival when Istanbul held the title of European Capital of Culture.

In April 2021 it was announced that Patrick Hahn would become Principal Guest Conductor and Artistic Advisor from the 2021/22 season.

Music directors

Principal players
The current principal chairs of the orchestra are as follows:

References

External links 

 
 Borusan
 Program Bifo
 Orchestra members

Turkish orchestras
Culture in Istanbul
Musical groups established in 1993
Symphony orchestras
1993 establishments in Turkey